Suyeong District is a gu in central Busan, South Korea.

Suyeong-gu was created in 1995 following its separation from Nam-gu. It is border in the North-East by the Suyeonggang River. The name 'Suyeong' came from 'Gyeongsang JwaSuyeong', means navy command of Gyeongsang left area (stand at Seoul and see south, this area is left side). The line 2 of Busan Subway runs through Suyeong-gu with 5 stations, from Millak to Namcheon. The southern terminal of line 3 is Suyeong station, making Suyeong an important location for subway transportation/transfers.

Administrative divisions

Suyeong-gu is divided into five legal dong, which altogether comprise ten administrative dong, as follows:

Namcheon-dong (two administrative dong)
Suyeong-dong
Mangmi-dong (two administrative dong)
Gwangan-dong (four administrative dong)
Millak-dong

Education

International schools:
Busan Japanese School

See also
Gwangan Bridge
Fortress site of Jwasuyeong
Geography of South Korea

References

External links
 
 
 Suyeong-gu website 

 
Districts of Busan